Acanthodiaptomus is a genus of Diaptomidae.

The genus was described in 1932 by Friedrich Kiefer.

The genus has cosmopolitan distribution.

Species include:
 Acanthodiaptomus denticornis (Wierzejski, 1887)
 Acanthodiaptomus pacificus (Burckhardt, 1913)
 Acanthodiaptomus tibetanus (Daday, 1907)

References

Cladocera